Dama is a genus of deer in the subfamily Cervinae, commonly referred to as fallow deer.

Name 
The name fallow is derived from the deer's pale brown colour. The Latin word dāma or damma, used for roe deer, gazelles, and antelopes, lies at the root of the modern scientific name, as well as the German Damhirsch, French daim, Dutch damhert, and Italian daino. In Croatian and Serbian, the name for the fallow deer is jelen lopatar ("shovel deer"), due to the form of its antlers. The Modern Hebrew name of the fallow deer is yachmur (יחמור).

Taxonomy and evolution
The genus includes two extant species:

Extant species

Some taxonomists classify the Persian fallow deer as a subspecies (D. d. mesopotamica), while others, such as the IUCN, treat it as a separate species (D. mesopotamica).

References

Cervines